Pamela Diane Allan (born 4 February 1953) is an Australian politician. She was a Labor member of the New South Wales Legislative Assembly from 1988 to 2007.

Allan first gained a place in the Legislative Assembly following her win in the seat of Wentworthville in the 1988 election. When this seat was dissolved as a result of a redistribution prior to the 1991 election; she attained preselection and won the seat of Blacktown, returning to a recreated Wentworthville at the 1999 election. She served as the state Minister for the Environment under Bob Carr's premiership from 4 April 1995 to 8 April 1999.

Allan retired from state politics in 2007.

References

Living people
1953 births
Australian Labor Party members of the Parliament of New South Wales
Members of the New South Wales Legislative Assembly
21st-century Australian politicians
21st-century Australian women politicians
Women members of the New South Wales Legislative Assembly